Doomsday King is the eighth studio album by Swedish melodic death metal band The Crown which was released on 27 September 2010 via Century Media Records.

A music video was made for "Doomsday King" and "Falling 'neath the Heaven's Sea".

Reception

Jordan Campbell of Last Rites compared the album to Possessed 13 calling "Angel of Death 1839" "fuckin' vicious". He also stated that after "Age of Iron", the whole experience becomes mediocre. Specifically, the vocalist, Jonas Stålhammar loses its flavor. Campbell also criticized the roles of Olsfelt, Tervonen, and Sunesson who lost their charm here due to their previous experience with other bands such as Angel Blake and Engel. Songs like "The Tempter and the Bible Black", "Soul Slasher", "Desolation Domain" are also have their flaws such as the tiring sounds and unfulfilled ambitions and false promises.

Scott Alisoglu of Blabbermouth.net had praised the album quoting saying: "When that first menacing riff blackens the sun, that vibrato sends a shiver up the spine, and that ominous bell clangs, the anticipation of what's to come is powerful enough to put down a bull elephant".

Larry Owens of the Teeth of the Divine praised songs such as "Age of Iron", "Through Eyes of Oblivion" and "Soul Slasher" while calling "The Tempter and the Bible Black", "Blood O.D." and "He Who Rises In Might" as mundane and boring.

Praising for those songs also came from No Clean Singing and Loud with the latter of which commented that despite repetitive nature, the album is a solid release, but suggests to listen to Deathrace King or Crowned in Terror before listening to this one.

Track listing

Personnel

The Crown
Marko Tervonen – guitars
Janne Saarenpää – drums
Marcus Sunesson – guitars
Jonas Stålhammar – vocals
Magnus Olsfelt – bass

Production
Dragan Tanasković – mastering
Gustavo Sazes – artwork
Marko Tervonen – engineering, mixing, mastering
Patrik Skoglöw – photography

References

The Crown (band) albums
2010 albums
Century Media Records albums